Mohammad Bagheri (born Mohammad-Hossein Afshordi is an Iranian Islamic Revolutionary Guard Corps military commander serving at the most senior military position available in Iran, Chief of Staff for the Armed Forces of the Islamic Republic of Iran. He holds the rank of Major General within the Iranian military.

Career
Also, a military intelligence expert with his experience dating back to the Iran–Iraq War, he holds a Ph.D. in political geography and reportedly teaches at Iran's Supreme National Defense University.
In 1980, he joined the IRGC.

Mohammad Bagheri and other commanders, including Mohammad Ali Jafari, Ali Fadavi, and Gholam Ali Rashid, are members of a group identified by the American Enterprise Institute (AEI) as the IRGC Command Network. According to AEI's Critical Threats Project, the group "dominates the upper echelons of Iran's military and controls planning, operations, intelligence, covert and irregular warfare operations, and internal security." He was promoted from his previous position as deputy chief of staff for intelligence and operations in the General Staff on June 28, 2016, replacing Hassan Firouzabadi.

In October 2017, he visited Iranian troops in Aleppo province in northern Syria.

In February 2022, according to Reuters, Bagheri announced that Iran will continue advancing its ballistic missile programme, both "in terms of quantity and quality".

On 21 October 2022, a White House press release stated that Iranian troops were in Crimea assisting Russia in launching drone attacks. Bagheri was the commander overseeing the Iranian army branches supplying Russia with drones.

Personal life
His elder brother, Hasan Bagheri, was a commander in the Iran–Iraq War.

Sanctions
On April 8, 2019, the United States designated Iran's Revolutionary Guards as a foreign terrorist organization. Prime Minister Benjamin Netanyahu of Israel immediately thanked Trump on Twitter. "We consider the U.S. troops in West Asia to be terrorists and if they do a damn thing, we will confront them vigorously" Mohammad Bagheri said.

In September 2022, following harsh suppression of protesters during the Mahsa Amini protests, Mohammad Bagheri was sanctioned by the United States and Canada.

See also 
 List of Iranian two-star generals since 1979
 Iranian involvement in the Syrian civil war
 Iran–Saudi Arabia proxy conflict

References 

Living people
Iranian individuals subject to the U.S. Department of the Treasury sanctions
Islamic Revolutionary Guard Corps personnel of the Iran–Iraq War
Islamic Revolutionary Guard Corps major generals
Recipients of the Order of Fath
Year of birth missing (living people)
Chiefs of Staff of the Iranian Armed Forces